Olivella is a municipality in Catalonia, in the province of  Barcelona, Spain. It is situated in the comarca of Garraf.

History

The first known village in the area was founded in 992 around a castle known as Castell vell. The inhabitants lived off dryland agriculture.
This initial nucleus was almost abandoned after the black plague caused numerous deaths.

The area was resettled in the 14th century and gradually prospered.
Nowadays there are some new housing developments in the area as well as the "Sakya Tashi Ling" Buddhist monastery, located in Plana Novella.

Geography
The village is located in the Garraf Massif, in a natural park area, not far from Barcelona.

References

External links

 Olivella official website 
 Government data pages 

Municipalities in Garraf